The events of 1988 in anime.

Accolades 
Ōfuji Noburō Award: My Neighbor Totoro

Releases

Births
February 4 - Ayano Niina, voice actress
February 19 - Miyu Irino, voice actor
March 16 - Azusa Kataoka, voice actress
April 15 - Manami Numakura, voice actress
June 2 - Ayaka Saitō, voice actress
June 11 - Yui Aragaki, voice actress
July 11 - Yuka Iguchi, voice actress
July 12 - Risa Taneda, voice actress
August 9 - Nozomi Yamamoto, voice actress
September 16 - Shizuka Hasegawa, voice actress
October 27 - Juri Nagatsuma, voice actress
November 11 - Mikako Komatsu, voice actress
December 6 - Nobunaga Shimazaki, voice actor
December 14 - Ayumu Murase, voice actor
December 26 - Arisa Noto, voice actress

See also
1988 in animation

External links 
Japanese animated works of the year, listed in the IMDb

Anime
Anime
Years in anime